Nacombogo may refer to places in Burkina Faso:

Nacombogo, Ipelce
Nacombogo, Toece